Olaus Islandsmoen (1873 in Sør-Aurdal – 1949) was a Norwegian educator, museologist and politician.

He was headmaster at Vestoppland Folk High School from 1906 to 1939. He was a member of the Parliament of Norway from 1916 to 1918. He was a chairman of Noregs Mållag from 1917 to 1921. He co-founded of the organization Norske Museers Landsforbund, a forerunner of Norges Museumsforbund, in 1918. In the 1930s he was a member of the council of Norges Forsvarsforening.

References

1873 births
1949 deaths
People from Sør-Aurdal
Radical People's Party (Norway) politicians
20th-century Norwegian politicians
Noregs Mållag leaders
Norwegian educators
Members of the Storting